Timothy Dalton on stage and screen:

Films

Television

Audiobooks
Novels by "Benjamin Black" (pseudonym of John Banville):

Stage

References

Male actor filmographies
British filmographies